"Statues" is a song by Hüsker Dü released as a single in 1981.  It was the band's first single, b/w the song "Amusement." This release finds the band in a period where its music was drifting from punk to post-punk. Briony Edwards of Louder wrote, "Though it shows an interest in experimentation that would follow the band through each stage of their career, the ... Krautrock inspired, Keith Levene-esque guitar is far removed from the boisterous hardcore that followed in its wake." The single's pressing was limited to 2,000 copies. The two tracks appear on the Everything Falls Apart and More CD.

In 2013, the Numero Group reissued the single with the studio outtakes "Writer's Cramp" and "Let's Go Die" as a 7" pairing in a gatefold jacket. The studio recordings are remastered from a first-generation sub-master, while "Amusement" is from the original live board tape.

Track listing

2013 reissue track listing

Notes
"Statues", "Writers Cramp" and "Let’s Go Die" were recorded at Blackberry Way, Minneapolis, August 1980
"Amusement" was recorded live at Duffy's, Minneapolis, October 1980

Personnel
Adapted from the liner notes of Everything Falls Apart and More.

Hüsker Dü
Bob Mould – guitar, vocals, 
Grant Hart – drums, vocals
Greg Norton – bass, vocals
 Technical
Hüsker Dü – producer (all tracks)
Colin Mansfield – producer ("Statues", "Writers Cramp", "Let’s Go Die"), engineer ("Amusement")
Steve Fjelstad – engineer (all tracks)
Terry Katzman – recorded by ("Amusement")
Fake Name Graphx – artwork

References

1980 songs
Hüsker Dü songs
1980 singles
Songs written by Bob Mould
Songs written by Grant Hart
Reflex Records singles